John Henderson may refer to:

Politics
Sir John Henderson, 5th Baronet (1752–1817), British Member of Parliament (MP) for Seaford, 1785–86
John Henderson (Mississippi politician) (1797–1857), United States Senator
John Henderson (Durham MP) (1811–1884), British Liberal MP for Durham 1864–74
John D. Henderson, American editor and pro-slavery politician
John B. Henderson (1826–1913), U.S. Senator and author of 13th Amendment to U.S. Constitution
John A. Henderson (1841–1904), corporate lawyer and politician in Florida
John S. Henderson (1846–1916), Representative from North Carolina's 7th district 
John Henderson (West Aberdeenshire MP) (1846–1922), Scottish chartered accountant, barrister and Liberal Member of Parliament
John M. Henderson (1868–1947), American politician (Texas House, 1907–09; Texas Senate, 1915–19)
John Henderson (Conservative politician) (1888–1975), Conservative MP for Glasgow Cathcart, 1946–1964
John Craik-Henderson (1890–1971), British Conservative Party politician
John E. Henderson (1917–1994), American politician (R–OH)
John Ward Henderson (1874-1925), American politician in Florida

Sport

American football
John G. Henderson (1892–?), American college football and baseball player and coach
John Henderson (University of Texas football player) (1912–2020), American college football player
John Henderson (wide receiver) (born 1943), American football player
Jon Henderson (born 1944), American football wide receiver
John Henderson (defensive tackle) (born 1979), American football player

Association football (soccer)
Jack Henderson (footballer) (1844–1932), Irish football (soccer) player
Jackie Henderson (1932–2005), Scottish football (soccer) player
John Henderson (Scottish footballer) (born 1941), Scottish footballer

Other sports
John Henderson (bowls) (born 1900), Canadian lawn bowler
John Henderson (cricketer) (1928-2019), New Zealand cricketer
John Henderson (rugby league) (1929–2014), rugby league footballer of the 1950s
John Henderson (ice hockey) (born 1933), Canadian ice hockey player
John Henderson (Australian rules footballer) (born 1938), Australian rules footballer  with Collingwood
John Henderson (hurler) (born 1957), Irish hurler
John Henderson (darts player) (born 1973), Scottish darts player

Others
John Henderson, 5th of Fordell (1605–1650), Scottish Royalist soldier during the English Civil War
John Henderson (actor) (1747–1785), English Shakespearean actor
John Henderson (collector) (1797–1878), English collector of works of art
John Henderson (architect) (1804–1862), Scottish architect
John Henderson (painter) (1860–1924), Scottish landscape and portrait painter
John Robertson Henderson (1863–1925), zoologist
John Henderson Jr. (1870–1923), American diplomat and educator
John Henderson (geologist) (1880–1959), New Zealand geologist and science administrator
John Tasker Henderson (1905–1983), Canadian physicist
John Oliver Henderson (1909–1974), U.S. federal judge 
Johnny Henderson (John Ronald Henderson, 1920–2003), British Army officer
John Henderson (activist) (1925-2010), Australian-American blind activist
John L. Henderson (born 1932), American university administrator
John Henderson (director) (born 1949), British film and television director
J. G. W. Henderson, English classicist
John Henderson (British Army officer), British general
John Henderson (historian), professor of Italian Renaissance history
John Henderson (engineer), U.S. Army engineer
John Henderson (Emmerdale), fictional character on the British soap opera Emmerdale

See also
Jock Henderson (disambiguation)
Jack Henderson (disambiguation)
Henderson (surname)